Enrico Musy, better known as Enrico Glori (3 August 1901 – 22 April 1966) was an Italian actor.

Biography
Born in Naples to a wealthy family of French origin, Glori became an actor in his thirties. He spent most of his time in France where he eventually made his film debut in the 1934 film Street Without a Name directed by Pierre Chenal. He starred in many other French films for the next three years until he was called back to Italy in 1937 after finishing his work on several films which includes The Former Mattia Pascal.

Glori was often known for his portrayal of villainous, sadistic and treacherous characters in most of his movies through the late 1930s and early 1940s. He appeared in over 126 films between 1934 and 1963, most of which were directed by Raffaello Matarazzo, Vittorio De Sica, Michelangelo Antonioni, Alberto Lattuada and many more. Glori's son Gianni was also an actor.

Glori retired in 1963, and died three years later after suffering from health problems.

Selected filmography

 Street Without a Name (1934) - Cruseo
 Merchant of Love (1935)
 Carnival in Flanders (1935) - (uncredited)
 Parisian Life (1936)
 Anne-Marie (1936) - Un homme d'affaires (uncredited)
 Jenny (1936)
 Quand minuit sonnera (1936)
 Compliments of Mister Flow (1936) - L'interprète (uncredited)
 Beethoven's Great Love (1936)
 The Man from Nowhere (1937) - Le coiffeur
 Un homme à abattre (1937)
 The Former Mattia Pascal (1937) - Il conte Papiano
 The Pearls of the Crown (1937) - La camérier du pape (Italian narrator)
 The Red Dancer (1937)
 La belle de Montparnasse (1937) - Ernesto
 The Three Wishes (1937) - Ricciardi
 Naples of Olden Times (1938) - Maurizio
 Tonight at Eleven (1938) - Gabry, il gangster
 Trois dans un moulin (1938)
 Princess Tarakanova (1938) - Il mercante / Le marchand
 Heartbeat (1938) - Bodigar Glazunoff
 L'escadrille de la chance (1938) - Carlo
 L'ultima carta (1938) - Lascard
 Giuseppe Verdi (1938) - Il maestro Mariani
 Under the Southern Cross (1938) - Simone
 Il suo destino (1938) - Don Pedro
 La signora di Montecarlo (1938)
 L'inconnue de Monte Carlo (1939)
 Terra di fuoco (1939) - L'impresario
 Diamonds (1939) - Carlo Deremont
 Il barone di Corbò (1939) - Il barone di Corbò
 Department Store (1939) - Bertini, il capo del personale
 Cardinal Messias (1939) - Il re Menelik
 The Fornaretto of Venice (1939) - Lorenzo Loredano
 È sbarcato un marinaio (1940) - Gomez
 La gerla di papà Martin (1940) - L'usuraio Charenzon
 Abandonment (1940) - Il marito di Maria
 L'arcidiavolo (1940) - Maurizio
 The Daughter of the Green Pirate (1940) - El Rojo
 The Prisoner of Santa Cruz (1941) - Luigi Bolli
 The Mask of Cesare Borgia (1941) - Sinistro dei Falchi
 The Betrothed (1941) - Don Rodrigo
 L'uomo venuto dal mare (1942) - Il ricattatore
 The Two Orphans (1942) - Il marchese di Presle
 Don Cesare di Bazan (1942) - Il visconte di Beaumont
 La maestrina (1942) - Giacomo Macchia
 Harlem (1943) - Ben Farrell
 Two Hearts Among the Beasts (1943) - Il signor Smith
 4 ragazze sognano (1943) - Il notaio Robert Morbleton
 Tehran (1946)
 Peddlin' in Society (1946) - Il commissario
 Il mondo vuole così (1946)
 The Opium Den (1947) - Commissario
 L'apocalisse (1947)
 Lost in the Dark (1947) - Paolo Nardone
 The Charterhouse of Parma (1948) - Gilletti, l'acteur de théâtre (uncredited)
 Manù il contrabbandiere (1948) - Claudio Geraudy, il banchiere
 Under the Cards (1948) - Claude Géraudy
 The Street Has Many Dreams (1948) - Il ricettatore (uncredited)
 Il corriere di ferro (1948)
 Monaca santa (1949) - Pasquale Cammarota
 Genoveffa di Brabante (1949) - Goro
 Romanticismo (1949) - Baraffini
 The Emperor of Capri (1949) - Il maggiordomo
 Cintura di castità (1950)
 Side Street Story (1950)
 Strano appuntamento (1950)
 La taverna della libertà (1950)
 Il voto (1950) - Lo sfruttatore
 Song of Spring (1951)
 Revenge of the Pirates (1951) - Governatore Raimondo di Velasco
 Nobody's Children (1951) - Rinaldi
 Repentance (1952)
 Viva il cinema! (1952)
 La voce del sangue (1952)
 Stranger on the Prowl (1952) - Signor Pucci
 At Sword's Edge (1952) - Miguel
 Il romanzo della mia vita (1952) - 'The Amateur Hour' Presenter
 The Lady Without Camelias (1953) - Franco Albonetti
 Terminal Station (1953) - Police Brigadier (uncredited)
 A Husband for Anna (1953) - Il proprietario del cinema
 Legione straniera (1953) - Padre di Irene
 Vortice (1953) - Direttore della prigione
 Mamma perdonami! (1953)
 Verdi, the King of Melody (1953) - Funz. teatro La Fenice (uncredited)
 Finalmente libero! (1953) - Prosecutor
 It Takes Two to Sin in Love (1954)
 Th Beach (1954) - The 'Palace Hotel' 's Director
 Desiderio 'e sole (1954) - Commendator Gaetano Bottoni
 Guai ai vinti (1954) - Secondo viaggiatore (uncredited)
 Loves of Three Queens (1954) - Priamo (segment: The Face That Launched a Thousand Ships)
 Dangerous Turning (1954) - Simoni, le brigadier
 Tears of Love (1954) - Comm. Goebritz
 Spring, Autumn and Love (1955) - Le maître d'hôtel
 Black Dossier (1955) - Vaillant
 Il nostro campione (1955) - Grottaglia
 Beautiful but Dangerous (1955) - (uncredited)
 Io piaccio (1955) - The Nightclub Waiter
 La ladra (1955) - Il Brigadiere
 La grande savana (1955)
 Escape to the Dolomites (1955) - Bepo Ghezzi
 Una sera di maggio (1955)
 Ricordami (1955) - industriale Barra
 Le secret de soeur Angèle (1956) - Le patron du restaurant
 Lo spadaccino misterioso (1956)
 Difendo il mio amore (1956)
 I vagabondi delle stelle (1956) - De Chiara
 Arriva la zia d'America (1956) - Savelli
 Parola di ladro (1957) - Degano
 An Eye for an Eye (1957) - Zardi (uncredited)
 The Love Specialist (1957) - Supporter of the Aquila Contrada (uncredited)
 Fortunella (1958) - Gambler
 Tabarin (1958) - Truffaut
 Adorabili e bugiarde (1958) - Sergeant Donatello
 The Adventures of Nicholas Nickleby (1958, TV series) - Arturo Gride
 Herod the Great (1959) - Taret
 The Employee (1959) - The Office Clerk with a Bow Tie (uncredited)
 Il terrore della maschera rossa (1960)
 La Dolce Vita (1960) - Ammiratore di Nadia
 Il Mattatore (1960)
 The Night They Killed Rasputin (1960)
 From a Roman Balcony (1960)
 Love in Rome (1960) - Curtatoni's Friend in Restaurant
 Constantine and the Cross (1961) - Livia's Father
 Tiro al piccione (1961)
 Vanina Vanini (1961)
 Mole Men Against the Son of Hercules (1961) - Kahab - the High Priest
 Duel of the Titans (1961) - Cittadino di Alba
 Barabbas (1961) - Man Pleading for Release of Prisoner
 Damon and Pythias (1962) - Nikos
 La colt è la mia legge (1965) - Sam

References

External links

1901 births
1966 deaths
Italian male film actors
Male actors from Naples
Italian expatriates in France
Italian people of French descent
20th-century Italian male actors